Ghilli is a 2004 Indian Tamil-language sports action film directed by Dharani and produced by A. M. Rathnam. It is a remake of the Telugu-language film Okkadu (2003). The film stars Vijay, Trisha and Prakash Raj with Ashish Vidyarthi, Dhamu, Mayilsamy and Janaki Sabesh playing supporting roles.

The soundtrack album and score were composed by Vidyasagar. Cinematography was handled by Gopinath and editing was done by V. T. Vijayan and B. Lenin. Dialogues for the film were written by Bharathan. The film was released on 17 April 2004 to highly positive reviews and became a blockbuster and a cult classic. The film ran for more than 200 days at the box office. It emerged as the highest-grossing Tamil film of 2004. Ghilli is considered to be one of the best films in Vijay's career.

Plot 
Saravanavelu "Velu" is a state-level Kabaddi player living in Chennai. His father, Deputy Commissioner of Police Sivasubramaniam, constantly chides him for neglecting his studies and favouring Kabaddi. In contrast, his mother dotes on him, and his younger sister Bhuvana, a sharp and inquisitive schoolgirl, constantly gets Velu into trouble with their father, but nevertheless adores him. One day, Velu gets sent to his relatives' wedding in Trichy, but skips the wedding to go and play in a kabaddi match in Madurai, unknown to his parents.

In Madurai, Muthupandi, a ruthless gang leader, lusts for a girl named Dhanalakshmi and would do anything to marry her. Muthupandi kills Dhanalakshmi's oldest brother as he rejects his offer to marry her. Dhanalakshmi's second oldest brother is also killed by Muthupandi when attempting to avenge his brother's murder. Dhanalakshmi's father is a meek man who gets terrified by Muthupandi's acts and asks Dhanalakshmi to leave Madurai and lead a peaceful life with her uncle in the United States, giving her money and her university certificates. Muthupandi catches her when she runs but Velu, who happens to pass by, clashes with Muthupandi and rescues Dhanalakshmi and then takes her to Chennai. Muthupandi swears revenge.

Velu takes Dhanalakshmi to his house and hides her in his room, unknown to his family. With the help of his friends, he arranges a passport, visa, and plane tickets for Dhanalakshmi so that she can go to the United States. Meanwhile, Muthupandi and his father, who is the Home Minister, ask Sivasubramaniam to search for Dhanalakshmi and the apparent kidnapper. When Sivasubramaniam discovers that it is his own son who did the "crime", Velu and Dhanalakshmi run away and hide in the lighthouse.

Dhanalakshmi has by now fallen in love with Velu, and has been accepted by his mother and sister. So she is reluctant to go to the US. Velu however, is adamant on sending her to the US, and he, along with his friends, get her to the Chennai International Airport in time for her flight before their kabaddi match against Punjab in the final match of the National League.

Sivasubramaniam, enraged that his son is a wanted criminal and yet plays in a kabaddi match, goes to the stadium to arrest Velu. By now, Velu too has fallen in love with Dhanalakshmi and begins to miss her, only to spot her in the stadium during the match. Velu's lack of focus in the game is replaced by his best performance on seeing Dhanalakshmi, winning his team the championship. Soon after, Velu is arrested by his father, but is then stopped by Muthupandi, who wants to fight Velu, having been incited by Dhanalakshmi to do so to prove his worth. Velu defeats Muthupandi and embraces Dhanalakshmi, but when Muthupandi regains consciousness and tries to kill Velu, a floodlight broken during the fight accidentally hits Muthupandi, who gets electrocuted to death.

Cast

Production

Development 
Vikram was the first choice for the film; due to other commitments, he was replaced by Vijay. Dharani was finalised as the director, whose previous film Dhool under A.M. Rathnam's production had been a financial success. Dharani's regular crew members including cinematographer Gopinath and music director Vidyasagar joined the film, while Rocky Rajesh and Raju Sundaram were chosen to choreograph the stunts and dances, respectively, for which Sundaram was awarded Filmfare Award for Best Dance Choreographer – South later. Jyothika was supposed to do the female lead role which was later replaced by actress Trisha, while Prakash Raj was signed on to reprise the villain's character from the original. Dhamu and Prabhu Deva's brother, Nagendra Prasad were recruited to essay supporting roles. Actor Thiagarajan's refusal meant that Ashish Vidyarthi was cast as Vijay's father in the film, while Janaki Sabesh and Baby Jennifer were selected to portray Vijay's mother and sister, respectively. Playback singer T. K. Kala made her acting debut with this film. Vimal who went on to act in films like Pasanga (2009) and Kalavani (2010) appeared in a small role as one of Vijay's teammates and also worked as "unofficial" assistant director.

Filming 
Filming began in July 2003, after Vijay had completed shooting for his previous film Thirumalai and the entire film was completed by February 2004. Shooting took place mainly in and around Chennai ,surrounding the areas like Mylapore and Besant Nagar and also at the cities of Rayagada in Odisha and Araku Valley, Simhachalam and Vishakhapatnam in Andhra Pradesh. The film's introduction fight scene and a song were shot at a costly set in Prasad studios. While cinematography was primarily handled by Gopinath, one song was filmed by K. V. Anand.  A lighthouse set was also erected. The interval chasing sequences were canned near the Meenakshi Amman Temple in Madurai and at Manapparai in Trichy district. The climax scene was shot in a crowd of one hundred thousand people in the 2003 Vinayagar Chaturthi occasion.

Music 
Vidyasagar was signed to compose the soundtrack album and background score for Ghilli; it marks his fourth collaboration with both Dharani and Vijay, with the former on Ethirum Puthirum, Dhill and Dhool, and working with the latter on Coimbatore Mappillai (1995), Nilaave Vaa (1998) and Thirumalai (2003). The soundtrack features six songs. The lyrics were penned by Yugabharathi, Pa. Vijay, Na. Muthukumar, Kabilan and Maran. The song Appadi Podu was later reused by Chakri as "Adaragottu" in the Telugu movie Krishna (2008). The song was also adapted by P. A. Deepak, a music producer, as Hum Na Tode in the 2013 Hindi movie Boss. The song is sung by Vishal Dadlani. Following the internet phenomenon of "Why This Kolaveri Di" in 2011, "Appadi Podu" was featured alongside "Oh Podu", "Nakka Mukka" and "Ringa Ringa" in a small collection of South Indian songs that are considered a "national rage" in India. The "Kabaddi" theme music from the soundtrack album was remixed by Anirudh Ravichander, for Master (2021).

Release 
Ghilli was released on 17 April 2004, delayed from 9 April. Though the reason for the postponement was not given out, rumours were that Rathnam's creditors put pressure on him to settle his accounts before release.

Reception

Critical reception 
Ghilli opened to favourable reviews. Sify rated the movie 5 out of 5 stars and said, "the good old formula is back with Gilli. A one-man-army combats an eccentric villain against all odds as he tries to save a helpless girl from his clutches. Dharani has done it for the third time by churning out this hit-and-run yarn that keeps you engaged and entertained for 160 minutes. IANS stated that "Gilli, story wise, is neither fresh popcorn nor spicy samosa found in theatres but the screenplay and overall treatment is as fresh and appetising as full meals after a long day and gave an overall rating of 3/5 stars. The Hindu stated that "Vijay, the hero whom the masses today identify with, and Prakash Raj, the inimitable villain in tow, this remake of the Telugu flick, "Okkadu," comes a clear winner". IndiaGlitz described the film as "an out and out entertainer". Rediff.com stated that, "Gilli portrays Vijay as a comic hero who battles his villains logically while his physical powers are exaggerated dramatically. Having said that, Gilli offers nothing less than sheer entertainment and an edgy thriller for the Tamil film industry, which is deprived of such films. Ananda Vikatan rated the film 45 out of 100. However Visual Dasan of Kalki gave a negative review, saying as the entire film revolves around a chase and melee between the villain and the hero till the very last scene, Ghilli is the epitome of back-scratching exaggeration for die-hard fans.

Box office 
Ghilli collected  in Tamil Nadu and  worldwide, it was the highest grossing Tamil film of the year. The film collected 2.05 crore in the Coimbatore territory, which was at the time only behind Padayappa.

Accolades 
 Filmfare Award for Best Villain – Tamil – Prakash Raj
 Filmfare Award for Best Dance Choreographer – South – Raju Sundaram
 Madras Corporate Club Best Actor Award – Vijay
 Dinakaran Best Actor Award – Vijay
 Film Today Best Actor Award – Vijay
 Dinakaran Best Villain Award – Prakash Raj

Legacy 
The popularity of Prakash Raj's role as Muthupandi led to several parodies incorporating the character and the endearing name "Chellam" (the way Muthupandi addresses Dhanalakshmi) became popular to sarcastically address an enemy. 

The scene in which Velu briefly uses Dhanalakshmi as a hostage when surrounded by Muthupandi and his men to manipulate them into surrendering their weapons was included in the list "Top 20 Mass Scenes" by Behindwoods. That scene was parodied by Shah Rukh Khan in the Hindi film Chennai Express (2013) and by Vijay himself in Master (2021). The success of the film led the cast and crew to again collaborate with another similar action film titled Kuruvi (2008). 

In Vijay's 2021 film Master, a kabaddi scene uses music montage invoking Ghilli, while the other song from the film, "Arjunaru Villu" was used in Naai Sekar (2022).

References

External links 
 

2000s sports films
2000s Tamil-language films
2004 action films
2004 films
Films directed by Dharani
Films scored by Vidyasagar
Films shot in Madurai
2000s masala films
Sports action films
Tamil remakes of Telugu films